Daishi Dance (born  in 1976) is a male Japanese DJ and record producer.

Summary
Daishi Dance performs in the heart of Sapporo, creating melodious house mixes that feature vocals conveying grief and discontent, and using three turn tables in a hybrid DJ style.
Daishi Dance has performed at many events with artists such as Studio Apartment and FreeTEMPO. He has performed at CLUB YELLOW, in Roppongi, as well as with Masanori Morita of Studio Apartment, as the duet "MUSeUM", which performs at many regular events in the club. Since March 2008, Daishi Dance has performed at the club ageHa, in Shinkiba, Tokyo at the regular party called "POOL HOUSE", and certain other events.
On July 2, 2008, Daishi Dance released "The Ghibli Set", which contained 12 licensed remixes songs featured in movies created by Studio Ghibli. This album hit number 12 on the Oricon charts, and remained at this position for 3 weeks.

Discography

Albums
The P.I.A.N.O. Set (July 19, 2006)
Melodies Melodies (October 3, 2007)
Spectacle. (October 7, 2009)
Wonder Tourism (November 14, 2012)
New Party! (September 25, 2013)
Gekimori (August 6, 2014)

Cover albums
The Ghibli Set (July 2, 2008)
The Ghibli Set 2 (December 18, 2013)

Remix compilations
Daishi Dance Remix (January 21, 2009)
Daishi Dance Remix... 2 (November 3, 2010)

Mixtapes
MyDJBooth: DJ Mix 1 (April 28, 2010)
MyDJBooth.2 (November 9, 2011)
MyDJBooth.3 (March 27, 2013)
EDM Land (May 14, 2014)

Original productions
2008: Chieko Kinbara – "Romance for Strings"
2008: Arvin Homa Aya – "Winter Love"
2010: Mika Nakashima – "Memory"
2010: Miliyah Kato – "I Miss You"
2011: Rainbow – "To Me"
2011: After School – "Shampoo"
2011: Mucc – "Arcadia"
2012: Maki Nomiya – "Sweet Soul Revue"
2012: Orange Caramel – "Milkshake""
2013: Miliyah Kato – "Nemurenu Yoru no Sei de"
2013: Miliyah Kato – "With U"
2014: Miliyah Kato – "Emotion"
2014: Ayumi Hamasaki – "What is Forever Love"
2015: Ayumi hamasaki – "Sayonara (feat. SpeXial)"

Remixes
2007: Axwell – "I Found You"
2007: Free Tempo – "Harmony"
2007: Michael Gray – "The Weekend"
2007: Double – "Spring Love"
2008: Mika Nakashima – "Sakura (Hanagasumi)"
2008: Miley Cyrus – "7 Things"
2008: Ayumi Hamasaki – "Heaven"
2008: Chieko Kinbara – "Romance for Strings"
2008: Genki Rockets – "Star Surfer"
2008: Roland Clark presents Urban Soul – "Life Time"
2009: Coldfeet – "Okay With Me"
2009: BWO – "Sunshine in the Rain"
2009: May J. – "Garden"
2009: Junsu/Jejung/Yuchun – "Long Way"
2010: Mitomi Tokoto – "That Ibiza Track"
2011: Marié Digby – "Part Of Your World"
2013: Carly Rae Jepsen – "Call Me Maybe"

Chart positions
Oricon Album Chart Number 12 for the Album "The Ghibli  Set" on the week of July 21.
Held for three weeks.

External links
Official Site
Daishi Dance on UNIVERSAL J
Daishi Dance's Blog
Artist Label

References

1976 births
Japanese DJs
Japanese electronic musicians
Living people
Shibuya-kei musicians
Universal Music Japan artists
Musicians from Sapporo
Electronic dance music DJs